Samuel George Frederick Habergham (born 20 February 1992) is an English professional footballer who plays as a left back for Wealdstone  in the National League

A product of the Norwich City academy, he later slipped into Non-League football and made his senior debut at semi-professional level for Tamworth. He moved to Braintree Town where he was part of the 2016 side that were beaten in the National League semi-finals, before following manager Danny Cowley to Lincoln City in 2016. Whilst at Sincil Bank he won both the National League title and the EFL Trophy, as well as being part of Cowley's Imps side that reached the FA Cup quarter finals during the 2016–17 season.

Club career
Habergham joined the Norwich City youth academy at the age of seven. He was promoted to the first team in 2009 which was managed by Bryan Gunn. In 2011, he joined Tamworth where he managed to make 35 appearances for the club.

In the summer of 2011, Habergham was released by Norwich City. Subsequently, he joined Football Conference club Braintree Town along with former Canary player Josh Dawkin. He was signed by the club as a replacement for Aswad Thomas who left Braintree for Grimsby Town. The club manager Alan Devonshire said that he was impressed by Habergham when he watched him play for Tamworth the previous season.

In 2015–2016 season, Habergham was a part of the Braintree squad that reached the promotion play-offs only to be defeated by Grimsby in the semi-final. At the end of the season, he rejected a contract extension proposal by the club. He instead signed a two-year contract with Lincoln City. He won the National League with the club in his first season and won promotion to EFL League Two.

Habergham made his debut in the 2017–2018 season in an EFL Trophy match against Mansfield Town of EFL League Two replacing Neal Eardley in the squad. Habergham would win the EFL Trophy that season with Lincoln City on the club's first ever trip to Wembley, but he only played three more times before succumbing to the effects of a serious knee injury. He had surgery in 2019, but was released when his contract expired having not played a game during the 2018–19 season.

On 6 January 2021, Habergham joined Grimsby Town on trial and was added to the clubs starting line up for their U23 fixture against Scunthorpe United. On 8 January 2021, Habergham signed for Grimsby on a six-month deal. On 12 May 2021 it was announced that he would leave Grimsby at the end of the season, following the expiry of his contract.

On 10 July 2021, Habergham linked up with his former Lincoln coach Danny Cowley by joining Portsmouth on trial, where he featured in Pompey's 5-2 pre-season victory over Havant & Waterlooville.

In February 2022 he joined Australian side Peninsula Power.

On 11 July 2022 Habergham signed for National League side Wealdstone. He made his debut as a substitute in a 1–0 defeat away to Eastleigh.

International career 
Habergham was called to the England under 17 team for 2009 UEFA European Under-17 Championship. He played once in the tournament, in a group stage defeat against Turkey. He has also played for the England C twice in 2016.

Career statistics

Club

Honours

Club
Lincoln City
National League: 2016–17
EFL Trophy: 2017–18

References

External links

Living people
1992 births
Association football defenders
English footballers
Norwich City F.C. players
Tamworth F.C. players
Braintree Town F.C. players
Lincoln City F.C. players
Grimsby Town F.C. players
Wealdstone F.C. players
National League (English football) players
English Football League players
Expatriate soccer players in Australia
English expatriate sportspeople in Australia